The following is a list of New Zealand people who are known best for their role in organised religion.

 Brian Patrick Ashby (1923–1988), Fifth Catholic bishop of Christchurch (1964–1985.)
 Alfred Walter Averill - Anglican Archbishop of New Zealand (1925-1940).
 Leonard Anthony Boyle (1930-2016) -  Fifth Catholic Bishop of Dunedin (1983–2005).
 Matthew Joseph Brodie (1864–1943), Second Catholic Bishop of Christchurch (1915–1943), first New Zealander by birth to be made a Catholic bishop.
 Denis George Browne - Third Catholic Bishop of Cook Island and Niue (1977–1983); Tenth Catholic Bishop of Auckland (1983–1994); Second Catholic Bishop of Hamilton (1995–2014).
 Colin David Campbell (born 21 September 1941) -  Sixth Catholic Bishop of Dunedin (2004-).
 Ernest Chitty (1883-1948), Anglican clergyman. New Zealand´s first blind university graduate.
 Henry Cleary - Sixth Catholic Bishop of Auckland (1910–1929).
 Thomas William Croke - Second Catholic Bishop of Auckland (1870–1874).
 Peter Cullinane (born 1936), First Catholic Bishop of Palmerston North (1980-2012).
 John Cunneen (1932–2010), Eighth  Catholic Bishop of the Christchurch (1995–2007).
 Brian Davis - Anglican Archbishop of New Zealand 1985 - 1997
 Reginald John Cardinal Delargey (1914-1979) - Cardinal-Priest of Immacolata al Tiburtino (1976-1979), Eighth Bishop of Auckland (1970–1974); Fourth Archbishop of Wellington and Metropolitan of New Zealand (1974–1978)
 John Atcherley Cardinal Dew (born 1948) - Cardinal-Priest of Sant’Ippolito (2015–present); Sixth Archbishop of Wellington and Metropolitan of New Zealand (2005–present)
 Owen John Dolan (born 1928), Catholic Coadjutor Bishop Emeritus of Palmerston North,  Coadjutor Bishop of Palmerston North (1995–2004)
 Michael Dooley, Seventh Catholic Bishop of Dunedin (2018–present)
 Paul Donoghue SM (born 18 January 1949), Sixth Catholic Bishop of Rarotonga (2011–present)
 Charles Drennan (born 1960) Second Bishop of Palmerston North (2012–2019)
 Patrick Dunn - Eleventh Catholic Bishop of Auckland, New Zealand (1995–present)
 Wallace Fard Muhammad - (disputed) Born as Wallace Dodd Ford, a New Zealand national, founder of Nation of Islam.
 Edward Gaines - First Catholic Bishop of Hamilton (1980–1994)
 Lloyd Geering - theologian
 Michael Gielen (born 1971) - appointed Auxiliary of the Catholic Diocese of Auckland on 6 January 2020.
 Samuel Aaron Goldstein (12 June 1852 – 29 May 1935), New Zealand rabbi, scholar and community leader.
 John Joseph Grimes (1842–1915) - First Catholic bishop of Christchurch (1887–1915)
 Octavius Hadfield - Anglican Primate 1890 - 1893
 Denis William Hanrahan (1933–1987), Sixth Catholic Bishop of Christchurch, New Zealand (1985–1987).
 Allen Howard Johnston - Anglican Primate of New Zealand
 Barry Jones (1941–2016), Ninth Catholic Bishop of Christchurch (2007–2016)
 Edward Michael Joyce (1904–1964), Fourth Catholic bishop of Christchurch (1950–1964).
 John Kavanagh (1913–1985), Fourth Catholic Bishop of Dunedin (1949–1985).
 Mazhar Krasniqi - First President of the Federation of Islamic Associations of New Zealand
 Robin Walsh Leamy SM (born 1935), Catholic Bishop of Rarotonga, Cook Islands and Niue (1984–1996), Auxiliary Bishop of Auckland (1996–present).
 George Lenihan OSB - Fifth Catholic Bishop of Auckland (1896–1910).
 James Liston - Archbishop; Seventh Catholic Bishop of Auckland (1929-1970).
 Stephen Marmion Lowe - Third Catholic Bishop of Hamilton (2015-2021); Twelfth Bishop of Auckland (2021–present)
 John Luck OSB -  Fourth Catholic Bishop of Auckland (1882–1896)
 Patrick James Lyons (1903–1967) - Third Catholic Bishop of Christchurch (1944–1950), Auxiliary Bishop of Sydney (1950–1957) and fourth Bishop of  Bishop of Sale (1957–1967).
 John Mackey - Eighth Catholic Bishop of Auckland (1974–1983)
 Max Takuira Matthew Mariu SM (1952–2005), Auxiliary Bishop of Hamilton (1988–2005)
 Paul Martin SM (born 5 May 1967) – Tenth Catholic Bishop of Christchurch (2017 – 2021); Coadjutor-Archbishop of Wellington (2021–present)
 Peter Thomas Bertram Cardinal McKeefry (1899-1973) - Cardinal-Priest of Immacolata al Tiburtino (1969-1973); Third Archbishop of Wellington and Metropolitan of New Zealand (1954–1973)
 Basil Meeking (born 1929, Bishop Emeritus of Christchurch (1995-) 7th Catholic Bishop of Christchurch 1987–1995).
 Patrick Moran - First Catholic Bishop of Dunedin
 David Moxon - Anglican Bishop of Waikato
 Samuel Tarratt Nevill - First Anglican Bishop of Dunedin
 Stuart France O'Connell SM (born 1935), Fifth Catholic Bishop of Rarotonga (1996 - )
 Hugh John O'Neill -  Catholic Coadjutor Bishop of Dunedin (1943–1946)
 Thomas O'Shea - Second Catholic Archbishop of Wellington and Metropolitan of New Zealand (1935–1954)
 Jean Baptiste Pompallier - First Catholic Bishop of Auckland (1838–1870)
 Francis William Mary Redwood - First Catholic Archbishop of Wellington and Metropolitan of New Zealand (1875–1935)
 Paul Reeves - Anglican Archbishop and Governor-General
 John Hubert Macey Rodgers  SM (1915–1997), Vicar Apostolic of Tonga (1953–1957),  Vicar Apostolic of Tonga and Niue (1957–1966), Bishop of Tonga (1966–1973), Bishop of Rarotonga (1973–1977), Auxiliary Bishop of Auckland (1977–1985), Superior of the Mission, Funafuti, Tuvalu (1986).
 George Augustus Selwyn - first Anglican Primate of New Zealand
 Owen Noel Snedden (1962–1981), Catholic Auxiliary Bishop of Wellington (1962–1981)
 Walter Steins SJ - Archbishop; Third Catholic Bishop of Auckland (1879–1881)
 Brian Tamaki - founder of Destiny Church
 William Brown Turei - Anglican Bishop of Aotearoa
 Herman van Staveren (1849-1930), New Zealand rabbi
 Whakahuihui Vercoe - Anglican Primate of New Zealand 2004-2006
 Michael Verdon (1838–1918) -  Second Catholic Bishop of Dunedin (1896–1918).
 Philippe-Joseph Viard SM - Vicar Apostolic/Administrator Apostolic of Wellington (1848–1860); First Catholic Bishop of Wellington  (1860–1872)
 William Henry Webster - Vicar of Waiuku (1899-1902); Officiate Auckland Diocese (1903-1906) 
 Thomas Stafford Cardinal Williams (born 1930) - Cardinal-Priest of Gesù Divin Maestro alla Pineta Sacchetti (1983–present); Fifth Archbishop of Wellington and Metropolitan of New Zealand (1979–2005)
 James Whyte - Third Catholic Bishop of Dunedin, New Zealand (1920–1957).

References